The Martin Hotel, at 94 W. Railroad St. in Winnemucca, Nevada, was built in 1913.  It is a historic hotel building, known also as Lafayette Hotel Annex and as Roman Tavern, which is listed on the National Register of Historic Places.

It is significant historically for its association with commerce in Winnemucca and for its association with Basque sheepherders.  It served as a boardinghouse for the sheepherders, and, as of its NRHP listing in 2003, "continues to be known for its Basque cuisine".

It is built in "Vernacular Commercial" style.  It was listed on the National Register of Historic Places in 2003.

See also
Winnemucca Hotel, also known for association with Basque sheepherders and NRHP-listed in Winnemucca

References

External links
Official Martin Hotel restaurant website

Buildings and structures in Humboldt County, Nevada
Winnemucca, Nevada
Defunct hotels in Nevada
Restaurants in Nevada
Hotel buildings completed in 1913
Hotel buildings on the National Register of Historic Places in Nevada
National Register of Historic Places in Humboldt County, Nevada
1913 establishments in Nevada
Basque-American culture in Nevada